is the eighteenth single by Japanese artist Masaharu Fukuyama. It was released on 27 August 2003. This single sold around 356,600 copies in its first week. It remained at the number 1 position on the Oricon chart for 5 consecutive weeks, breaking the artist record of four consecutive week from his 1994 single "It's Only Love". Niji was used as the theme song for Fuji Television drama Water Boys and Water Boys 2. "Himawari", written by himself, was originally released as a single sung by Kiyoshi Maekawa in 2002.

Track listing
Niji
Himawari
Sore ga Subete sa
Himawari: Fields of Toscana
Niji: Synchronised Mix
Niji (original karaoke)
Himawari (original karaoke)
Sore ga Subete sa (original karaoke)

Oricon sales chart (Japan)

References

2003 singles
Masaharu Fukuyama songs
Oricon Weekly number-one singles
Japanese television drama theme songs